Sudheer was an Indian actor in Malayalam movies. He was a lead actor during the 1970s. He acted in more than 100 movies. His role in the movie Chembarathy in 1972 was well noted. He won a Kerala State Film Award in 1975 for his performance in the movie Sathyathinte Nizhalil.

Sudheer has also played the second lead in the 1978 Rajnikanth starrer Bairavi and has played the lead role in Sonna Nambamateengae

Background
Sudheer hailed from Kodungallur and was the son of Padiyath P.A.Mohiyuddin, a former District Judge. His first film was Nizhalattam in 1970.

Awards
 1975 Kerala State Film Awards: Best Actor - Sathyathinte Nizhalil

Filmography

Malayalam

 Maaraatha Naadu (2004)
 Cheri (2003)
 Mohacheppu (2002)
 Dupe Dupe Dupe (2001)
 Nirnnayam (1995) as Adv. Rajendran
 Kaakkaykkum Poochaykkum Kalyaanam (1995)
 Sargavasantham (1995)
 Karma (1995)
 Kadal (1994)
 Nepolean (1994)
 Bhoomi Geetham (1993) as Doctor Philip
 Prosecution (1990)
 Sthreekku Vendi Sthree (1990)
 Aval Oru Sindhu (1989)
 Mangalya Charthu (1987) as College Principal
 Evidence (1988)
 Bheekaran (1988)
 Agnichirakulla Thumpi (1988)
 Kaatturaani (1985)
 Chorakku Chora (1985)
 Ottayaan (1985)
 Kiraatham (1985) as Adv Ramakrishnan Nair
 Nishedi (1984) as Williams
 Raajavembaala as Varghese
 Bandham (1983)
 Shaari Alla Shaarada(1982)
 Theekkali (1981)
 Anthappuram (1980)
 Swargadevatha (1980)
 Vilkkanundu Swapnangal (1980)
 Avano Atho Avalo (1979)
 Kalliyankaattu Neeli (1979)
 Lovely (1979)
 Driver Madyapichirunnu (1979)
 Aval Niraparaadhi (1979)
 Avalude Prathikaaram (1979)
 Black Belt (1978)
 Aalmaaraattam (1978)
 Seemanthini (1978)
 Ashokavanam (1978)
 Puthariyankam (1978)
 Beena (1978) as Prasad
 Tiger Salim (1978)
 Mattoru Karnan (1978)
 Raghuvamsham (1978)
 Kaithappoo (1978)
 Bairavi (1978)- Tamil
 Aanayum Ambaariyum (1978)
 Varadakshina (1977)
 Pattalaam Jaanaki (1977)
 Sooryakanthi (1977)
 Muhoorthangal (1977)
 Raajaparampara (1977)
 Thaalappoli (1977)
 Yatheem (1977) as Latheef
 Nirakudam (1977)
 Sindooram (1976)
 Aayiram Janmangal (1976) as Babu
 Amba Ambika Ambaalika (1976)
 Chirikkudukka (1976) as Chandran Menon
 Thulavarsham (1976) as Maniyan
 Themmadi Velappan (1976) as Vijayan
 Agnipushpam (1976)
 Missi (1976)
 Udyaanalakshmi (1976)
 Sathyathinte Nizhalil(1975)
 Omanakkunju (1975)
 Hello Darling (1975) as Rajesh
 Kalyaanappanthal (1975)
 Gnan Ninne Premikkunnu (1975)
 Chalanam (1975)
 Priye Ninakkuvendi (1975)
 Chandanachola (1975)
 Love Letter (1975)
 Penpada (1975) as Chandran
 Madhurappathinezhu (1975)
 Boy Friend (1975)
 Poonthenaruvi (1974) as Shaji
 Vrindaavanam (1974)
 Pattaabhishekam (1974)
 Suprabhaatham (1974)
 Naathoon (1974)
 Ayalathe Sundari (1974) as Police Inspecter
 College Girl (1974)
 Oru Pidi Ari (1974)
 Moham (1974)
 Honeymoon (1974)
 Urvashi Bharathi (1973)
 Raakkuyil (1973)
 Kaliyugam (1973)
 Maasappadi Maathupilla (1973)
 Swapnam (1973) as Bindu
 Achaani (1973) as Babu
 Police Ariyaruthu (1973) as Johnson
 Kaalachakram (1973)
 Manassu (1973)
 Ragging (1973)
 Chenda (1973)
 Periyar (1973)
 Chaayam (1973)
 Theertha Yathra (1972)
 Chembarathi (1972) as Rajan
 Ernakulam Junction (1971) as Ramu
 Anaadha Shilpangal (1971) as Suresh
 Nizhalattam (1970) as Haridasan
 Detective 909 Keralathil (1970)
 Palunku Paathram (1970)
 Rest House (1969)

Tamil
 Bairavi 1978
 Neeya? 1979
 Soolam 1980
 Sonna Nambamateengae

References

External links

Sudheer at MSI

Indian male film actors
Kerala State Film Award winners
Male actors from Kerala
Male actors in Malayalam cinema
2004 deaths
Year of birth missing
People from Thrissur district
Male actors in Tamil cinema